Stephen L Richards (June 18, 1879 – May 19, 1959) was a prominent leader in the Church of Jesus Christ of Latter-day Saints (LDS Church). He was a member of the Quorum of the Twelve Apostles of the LDS Church and the First Counselor in the First Presidency.

Early life

Richards was born in Mendon, Utah Territory. He was the oldest of ten children born to Stephen Longstroth Richards and Emma Louise Stayner. He was raised in Cache Valley. Richards was the grandson of Willard Richards, an early apostle of the church and colleague of Joseph Smith.

Richards married Irene Smith Merrill (a maternal granddaughter of George A. Smith) in 1900. The couple had nine children. One of their sons was Lynn S. Richards, a Utah politician and leader in the church.

Education and profession
Richards did undergraduate studies at the University of Utah. He received a J.D. degree from the University of Chicago Law School in 1904. Richards began his law school career at the University of Michigan, later transferring to Chicago.

After graduating from the University of Chicago, Richards practiced law in Salt Lake City and was a professor of law at the University of Utah. Richards had been considering running for governor of Utah in the 1918 election, but he decided not to do this after being selected as an apostle in 1917.

Church leadership
Joseph F. Smith called Richards to be an apostle at the age of 37. As an apostle, Richards became a member of the superintendency of the Deseret Sunday School Union under David O. McKay in 1918. In April 1919, McKay was appointed Church Commissioner of Education and chose Richards as his first counselor. Richards would remain a counselor in the Deseret Sunday School Union Superintendency until 1934 when apostles were released from these positions, which freed up the apostles to focus on other aspects of church governance.

When McKay became LDS Church president, he selected Richards as his first counselor. Richards served in that position from April 9, 1951, until his death. Richards followed his grandfather, Willard Richards, by serving in the Quorum of the Twelve and in the First Presidency.

The Christus statue that is at the visitors center on Temple Square in Salt Lake City was purchased by Richards as a gift to McKay.

Richards was a mentor to Gordon B. Hinckley as the head of the Radio, Publicity and Missionary Literature Committee when Hinckley served as its executive secretary.

Death

Richards died in Salt Lake City at the age of 79, shortly before his 80th birthday.

See also
 Stayner Richards

References

External links
 Grampa Bill's G.A. Pages: Stephen L Richards

1879 births
1959 deaths
American general authorities (LDS Church)
Apostles (LDS Church)
Counselors in the First Presidency (LDS Church)
Counselors in the General Presidency of the Sunday School (LDS Church)
Latter Day Saints from Illinois
Latter Day Saints from Michigan
Latter Day Saints from Utah
People from Mendon, Utah
Richards–Young family
University of Chicago Law School alumni
University of Michigan Law School alumni
University of Utah alumni
University of Utah faculty